The Milwaukee metropolitan area (also known as Metro Milwaukee or Greater Milwaukee) is a major metropolitan area located in Southeastern Wisconsin, consisting of the city of Milwaukee and the surrounding area. There are several definitions of the area, including the Milwaukee–Waukesha–West Allis metropolitan area and the Milwaukee–Racine–Waukesha combined statistical area. It is the largest metropolitan area in Wisconsin, and the 39th largest metropolitan area in the United States.

Definitions

Metropolitan area

The U.S. Census Bureau defines the Milwaukee Metropolitan area as containing four counties in southeastern Wisconsin: Milwaukee and the three WOW counties: Ozaukee, Washington, and Waukesha. The Metropolitan population of Milwaukee was 1,575,179 in the Census Bureau's 2019 estimate, making it the 39th largest in the United States.

The city of Milwaukee is the hub of the metropolitan area. The eastern parts of Racine County, eastern parts of Waukesha County, southern part of Ozaukee County, southeastern part of Washington County, and remainder of Milwaukee County are the most urbanized parts of the outlying counties.

The character of the area varies widely. Mequon, Brookfield, and the North Shore (Fox Point, Whitefish Bay, River Hills, Shorewood, Glendale, and Bayside) are more white-collar, while West Milwaukee, West Allis, and St. Francis are more blue-collar.

Metro Milwaukee draws commuters from outlying areas such as Madison, Chicago and the Fox Cities.
It is part of the Great Lakes Megalopolis containing an estimated 54 million people.

Combined statistical area
The Milwaukee–Racine–Waukesha Combined Statistical Area is made up of the Milwaukee–Waukesha–West Allis Metropolitan Statistical Area (Milwaukee, Waukesha, Washington and Ozaukee counties), the Racine Metropolitan Statistical Area (Racine County), the Beaver Dam Micropolitan Statistical Area (Dodge County), the Watertown-Fort Atkinson Micropolitan Area (Jefferson County), and the Whitewater-Elkorn Micropolitan Area (Walworth County) according to the U.S. Census. Updated definitions released in February 2013 added Dodge, Jefferson and Walworth Counties to the Milwaukee CSA.  Kenosha, despite being just 32 miles from Milwaukee and 50 miles from Chicago, is included as part of the Chicago CSA, as Kenosha has more residents who commute to the Chicago area. As of the 2019 census estimates, the Milwaukee–Racine–Waukesha Combined Statistical Area population was 2,047,966, the largest in Wisconsin and the 33rd largest in the United States.

Counties 
There are eight counties in the U.S. Census Bureau's Milwaukee–Racine–Waukesha Combined statistical area. 
 Dodge
 Jefferson
 Milwaukee
 Ozaukee
 Racine
 Walworth
 Washington
 Waukesha

Cities (combined statistical area)

Primary
 Milwaukee

Other principal cities 

 Racine
 Waukesha

Metro area cities and villages with more than 10,000 inhabitants 

 Beaver Dam
 Brookfield
 Brown Deer
 Burlington
 Caledonia
 Cedarburg
 Cudahy
 Delavan
 Elkhorn
 Fort Atkinson
 Franklin
 Germantown
 Glendale
 Grafton
 Greendale
 Greenfield
 Hartford
 Menomonee Falls
 Mequon
 Mount Pleasant
 Muskego
 New Berlin
 Oak Creek
 Oconomowoc
 Pewaukee
 Port Washington
 Richfield
 Shorewood
 South Milwaukee
 Sussex
 Watertown
 Wauwatosa
 West Allis
 West Bend
 Whitefish Bay
 Whitewater

Metro area cities, towns and villages with fewer than 10,000 inhabitants 

 Addison
 Barton
 Bayside
 Belgium
 Big Bend
 Bohners Lake
 Browns Lake
 Brownsville
 Butler
 Chenequa
 Clyman
 Darien
 Delafield (city)
 Delafield (town)
 Dousman
 Dover
 Eagle
 Eagle Lake
 East Troy
 Elkhorn
 Elm Grove
 Elmwood Park
 Erin
 Farmington
 Fox Lake
 Fox Point
 Franksville
 Fredonia
 Genesee
 Germantown (town)
 Hales Corners
 Hartland
 Herman
 Horicon
 Hustisford
 Ixonia
 Iron Ridge
 Jackson
 Jefferson
 Johnson Creek
 Juneau
 Kekoskee
 Kewaskum
 Lac La Belle
 Lake Geneva
 Lake Mills
 Lannon
 Leroy
 Lisbon
 Lomira
 Lowell
 Mayville
 Merton
 Mukwonago
 Nashotah
 Neosho
 Newburg
 North Bay
 North Prairie
 Norway
 Oconomowoc Lake
 Okauchee Lake
 Ottawa
 Palmyra
 Pewaukee(village)
 Polk
 Randolph
 Raymond
 Reeseville
 River Hills
 Rochester
 Rubicon
 Saukville
 Slinger
 St. Francis
 Sturtevant
 Sullivan
 Summit
 Theresa
 Thiensville
 Trenton
 Union Grove
 Vernon
 Wales
 Walworth
 Waterford
 Waterloo
 Waupun
 Wayne
 West Milwaukee
 Williams Bay
 Wind Lake
 Wind Point
 Yorkville

Unincorporated Communities and Census Designated Places 

 Allenton
 Boltonville
 Cheeseville
 Colgate
 Ebenezer
 Farmersville
 Fillmore
 Genesee Depot
 Herman Center
 Hubertus
 Kansasville
 Kohlsville
 Lake Church
 Lakefield
 Myra
 Nabob
 Nenno
 North Cape
 Oak Hill
 Pipersville
 Pike Lake
 Rockfield
 Saint Michaels
 Saylesville
 Saylesville 
 Stone Bank
 Thompson
 Tichigan
 Ulao
 Waubeka
 Woodland

Debate over metropolitan government 

Although each county and its various municipalities are self-governing, there is some cooperation in the metropolitan area. The Milwaukee Metropolitan Sewerage District (MMSD) is a state-chartered government agency which serves 28 municipalities in the five counties.

At the same time, some in the area see the need for more consolidation in government services. The Kettl Commission and former Wisconsin Governor Scott McCallum have supported initiatives to do this. However, full consolidation has faced unsubstantiated criticism as a means of diluting minority voting power.

References

Metro Milwaukee Portal

External links
2003 article on consolidation of area governments
https://web.archive.org/web/20170118134056/https://www.whitehouse.gov/sites/default/files/omb/bulletins/2013/b-13-01.pdf

 
Metropolitan areas of Wisconsin